The men's 4 × 100 metre freestyle relay event at the 2020 Summer Olympics was held on 25 and 26 July 2021 at the Tokyo Aquatics Centre. It was the thirteenth appearance of the event, which has been held from 1964 to 1972 and then at every Games since 1984.

Records

Prior to this competition, the existing world and Olympic records were as follows.

No new records were set during the competition.

Qualification

The top 12 teams in this event at the 2019 World Aquatics Championships qualified for the Olympics. An additional 4 teams will qualify through having the fastest times at approved qualifying events during the qualifying period (1 March 2019 to 30 May 2020).

Competition format
The competition consists of two rounds: heats and a final. The relay teams with the best 8 times in the heats advance to the final. Swim-offs are used as necessary to break ties for advancement to the next round.

Schedule
All times are Japan Standard Time (UTC+9)

Results

Heats
The relay teams with the top 8 times, regardless of heat, advanced to the final.

Final

References

Men's 4 x 100 metre freestyle relay
Olympics
Men's events at the 2020 Summer Olympics